Gunnar Halle DFC (19 November 1907 – 29 October 1986) was a Norwegian engineer and military officer.

He was born in Nesodden to lieutenant colonel Einar Halle and Bertha Susanne Koren, and was married to Agnes Reiersen. 

During the Second World War he served with the Norwegian Air Forces, in Norway, Canada and England. His war decorations include the War Cross with Sword, the St. Olav's Medal With Oak Branch, War Medal, Defence Medal 1940–1945, Haakon VII 70th Anniversary Medal, the British Distinguished Flying Cross with bar, 1939–45 Star, and France and Germany Star.

He continued his military career after World War II, and held various positions in the aviation industry and with the Royal Norwegian Air Force.

He died in 1986.

References

1907 births
1986 deaths
People from Nesodden
Norwegian Institute of Technology alumni
Norwegian Army personnel of World War II
Royal Norwegian Air Force personnel of World War II
Recipients of the War Cross with Sword (Norway)
Recipients of the St. Olav's Medal with Oak Branch
Recipients of the Distinguished Flying Cross (United Kingdom)